Danila Vladimirovich Vedernikov (born 6 June 2001) is a Russian football player. He plays as a left-back for FC Volgar Astrakhan on loan from FC Rostov.

Club career
He made his debut in the Russian Professional Football League for FC Krasnodar-2 on 17 March 2018 in a game against FC Biolog-Novokubansk.

He made his Russian Premier League debut for FC Rostov on 21 September 2019 in a game against FC Tambov, substituting Khoren Bayramyan in the 88th minute.

On 3 July 2021, he returned to FC Volgar Astrakhan on loan for another season. On 21 January 2022, Rostov terminated the loan early. On 28 January 2022, he was loaned to FC Kuban Krasnodar. On 11 June 2022, Vedernikov returned to FC Volgar Astrakhan on a new loan.

References

External links
 

2001 births
Sportspeople from Astrakhan
Living people
Russian footballers
Russia youth international footballers
Association football defenders
FC Krasnodar-2 players
FC Rostov players
FC Urozhay Krasnodar players
FC Volgar Astrakhan players
Russian Premier League players
Russian First League players
Russian Second League players